A list including the properties and districts listed on the California Historical Landmarks in San Diego County, Southern California.

Note: Click the "Map of all coordinates" link to the right to view a Google map of all properties and districts with latitude and longitude coordinates in the table below.

Listed landmarks

|}

References

See also

List of California Historical Landmarks
National Register of Historic Places listings in San Diego County, California

  

 
.
. 
List of California Historical Landmarks
Geography of San Diego County, California

Protected areas of San Diego County, California
San Diego County, California
History of Southern California